A castle is a type of fortified structure built during the Middle Ages. 

Castle or Castles may also refer to:

Arts, entertainment, and media

Games
 Castle (card game), also known as Palace, a shedding card game designed by Bruno Faidutti and Serge Laget
 Castle (shogi), a defensive structure used in the game shogi
 Castle, in chess, an informal term for rook
To castle, or castling, in chess
 Castles (video game), developed by Quicksilver and published by Interplay Entertainment in 1991 and 1992

Literature
 Castle (book), a 1977 book by David Macaulay
 Castle (novel), a 2000 novel by Garth Nix

Music
 Castle (Sherman Chung album), 2008
 Castle (Jolin Tsai album), 2004
Castle (Halsey song), 2015
Castles (song), by Freya Ridings (2019)
Castles, an album by Joy of Cooking (1972)
 "Castle", a song by Eminem from the album Revival (2017)
 "Castle", a song by Macklemore & Ryan Lewis from the album The Heist (2012)

Other uses in arts, entertainment, and media
 Castle (TV series), an American TV series, 2009–2016 
 Castles (TV series), a British soap opera, 1995

Business and organisations
 Castle (company), a British loudspeaker manufacturer
 Castle Building Centres Group, Canadian retailers of lumber and building materials
 Castle Communications, a British record label
 Castle Technology, a British computer company

People
 Castle (surname), including a list of people and fictional characters with that name

Places

United Kingdom
 Castle (Abergavenny ward), an electoral ward in Monmouthshire, Wales
 Castle (Colchester electoral ward), Essex, England
 Castle (District Electoral Area), Belfast, Northern Ireland
 Castle, Bedford
 Castle, Cambridge
 Castle, Cardiff
 Castle, Leicester
 Castle, Newcastle upon Tyne
 Castle, Swansea

United States
 Castle, Oklahoma

Other uses
 Castle Project, a computer application framework
 Operation Castle, a series of nuclear tests in 1954
 University College, Durham, England, known informally as Castle
  USS Castle (DD-720), an uncompleted U.S. Navy destroyer

See also
 Aftercastle, part of a ship
 Castle class (disambiguation)
 Castle House (disambiguation)
 Castle River (disambiguation)
 Castle series (disambiguation)
 Forecastle, part of a ship
 Fort (disambiguation)
 Fortress (disambiguation)
 Palace (disambiguation)
 Royal Castle (disambiguation)
 The Castle (disambiguation)
 White Castle (disambiguation)